The fourth season of Lucha Underground, a lucha libre or professional wrestling television show, began on June 13, 2018. The third season, just like the past 3 seasons was broadcast on the El Rey Network in the United States. The producers of Lucha Underground announced on November 10, 2017, that Lucha Underground was renewed for a fourth season set to premiere in 2018. In February 2018, two of the show's producers, Eric van Wagenen and Chris DeJoseph, announced that the Temple would move from its former location in Boyle Heights to Union Central Cold Storage in Downtown Los Angeles. In early 2018, Lucha Underground entered into a working relationship with Impact Wrestling. On April 6, 2018, Lucha Underground held a collaborative event with Impact Wrestling that streamed lived on Twitch. During the co-promoted event with Impact Wrestling, a commercial aired announcing that the fourth season would begin airing on June 13, 2018.

The Lucha Underground show is a lucha libre serial drama television series that combines traditional professional wrestling matches with fictional storylines and effects. Season four followed follow up on the events of season three, especially storylines left unresolved at the end of Ultima Lucha Tres. Although it was not conceived as such, it ultimately turned out to be the final season, as Lucha Underground was later discontinued.

Cast and crew

Episodes

References

External links
 Official website
 MGM webpage for Lucha Underground

2018 American television seasons
Lucha Underground